Richard Noel-Hill, 4th Baron Berwick of Attingham (7 November 1774 – 28 September 1848), was born in the parish of St. Martin-in-the-Fields, Covent Garden, London, England, and baptised there on 11 November.

He was the son of Noel Hill of Attingham, who was created Baron Berwick in 1784, and Anna Vernon. He married Frances Maria Mostyn-Owen, daughter of William Mostyn Owen and Rebecca Dod, on 16 January 1800 at St. Chad's, Shrewsbury.

Richard Noel-Hill, 4th Baron Berwick of Attingham, was baptised with the name of Richard Hill. He was educated in 1787 at Rugby School and graduated from St John's College, Cambridge, in 1795 with a Master of Arts (M.A.).  He was ordained deacon (1797) and then priest in the Church of England in 1798. He was Rector from 1799 of both Berrington, Shropshire (to 1845), and of Thornton-in-the-Moors, Cheshire (to 1846).  He was Mayor of Shrewsbury in 1824. On 19 March 1824, his name was legally changed to Richard Noel-Hill by Royal Licence. He succeeded to the title of 4th Baron Berwick of Attingham on 4 August 1842.

In 1847 he served as treasurer of the Salop Infirmary in Shrewsbury.

He died on 28 September 1848, aged 73, at Attingham, and was buried at the parish church of Atcham, Shropshire, on 6 October.

Coat of arms

References

1774 births
1848 deaths
Alumni of St John's College, Cambridge
Mayors of places in Shropshire
Richard